This is a list of media in Trois-Rivières, Quebec.

Radio

Television
Trois-Rivières is served by the Cogeco cable system, except the Cap-de-la-Madeleine area, which is serviced by Vidéotron.

Print
 Le Nouvelliste
 L'Écho de Trois-Rivières

Trois-Rivieres
 
Media, Trois-Rivieres